Sola Access Information Language (SAIL)  native protocol is primary form of front end access electronic communication protocol of the Sola Trading platform

See also
 List of active electronic trading protocols

References

External links 
  SOLA Homepage 

Financial markets
Electronic trading systems
Financial routing standards